There are various lexical differences between Quebec French and Metropolitan French in France. These are distributed throughout the registers, from slang to formal usage.

Notwithstanding Acadian French in the Maritime Provinces, Quebec French is the dominant form of French throughout Canada, with only very limited interregional variations.  The terms Quebec French and Canadian French are therefore often used interchangeably.

Standardization
The Office québécois de la langue française believes that neither morphology nor syntax should be different between Québécois and Metropolitan French, and even that phonetic differences should be kept to a minimum.  However, starting in the 1960s, it agreed to the use of words then called "well-formed Canadianisms (canadianismes de bon aloi)," that either are regional in nature (such as names of plants and animals), have been used since before the Conquest, or are justified in their origin and are considered to be equivalent or "better" than the standard equivalent.

A very small list of words was published in 1969, mainly containing words that were archaic in France, but still common in Quebec.  This list especially contained imperial units and words from aboriginal languages.  Subsequent lists have been published regularly since then.

Many differences that exist between Quebec French and European French arise from the preservation of certain forms that are today archaic in Europe. New words were also created for Quebec specialties that do not exist in Europe.

As with any two regional variants, there is an abundance of slang terms found in Quebec that are not found in France. Quebec French profanity uses references to Catholic liturgical terminology, rather than the references to prostitution that are more common in France. Many English words and calques have also been integrated in Quebec French, although less than in France. In Quebec, borrowed English words tend to have the same meaning as the English word. In France, they often have a very different meaning; for example 'le smoking' for 'tuxedo'. Borrowing from English is politically sensitive in Quebec and tends to be socially discouraged.

Gender-neutral usage

Formal Quebec French also has a very different approach to gender-neutral language than Metropolitan French.  There is a much greater tendency to generalize feminine markers among nouns referring to professions. This is done in order to avoid having to refer to a woman with a masculine noun, and thereby seeming to suggest that a particular profession is primarily masculine. Forms that would be seen as highly unusual or stridently feminist in France are commonplace in Quebec, such as la docteure, la professeure, la première ministre, la gouverneure générale, and so forth. Many of these have been formally recommended by the Office québécois de la langue française and adopted by society at large. Official government and state titles and designations always have official, mandated French equivalent terms for each gender.

Also, rather than following the rule that the masculine includes the feminine, it is relatively common to create doublets, especially in polemical speech: Québécoises et Québécois, tous et toutes, citoyens et citoyennes.

As an isolated anecdote, a Quebec labour union once decided to promulgate an epicene neologism on the model of fidèle, calling itself the Fédération des professionnèles, rather than use either professionnels (masculine only) or professionnels et professionnelles (masculine and feminine). This sparked a fair amount of debate and is rather on the outer edge of techniques for nonsexist writing in Quebec French.

Morphology (word formation)

Some suffixes are more productive in Quebec than in France, in particular the adjectival suffix -eux, which has a somewhat pejorative meaning: téter → téteux (thick, dumb, nitpicking, nerd), niaiser → niaiseux (foolish, irritating); obstiner → ostineux (stubborn); pot → poteux (a user or dealer of marijuana). This originates in the Norman language.

The adjectival suffix -euse is added to verbal stems to form "the machine that verbs."  For example, laver → laveuse "washing machine"; balayer → balayeuse "vacuum cleaner" (but "streetsweeper" in France). In France "vacuum cleaner" is "aspirateur".

Preservation of forms
Many differences that exist between Quebec French and Metropolitan French arise from the preservation of certain forms that are today archaic in Europe.  For example, espérer for "to wait" (attendre in France).

Cour in Quebec is a backyard (jardin in French), whereas in France cour has dropped this meaning and primarily means a courtyard (as well as other meanings like court). However, in some areas of France, such as in the mining regions of northern France, cour still means backyard.

The word breuvage is used for "[a] drink" in addition to boisson; this is an old French usage (bevrage) from which the English "beverage" originates. Breuvage may be used in European French, but generally indicates some nuance, possibly pejorative.

The word piastre or piasse, a slang term for a dollar (equivalent to "buck" in English), was in fact the term originally used in French for the American or Spanish dollar (they had the same value for a long period).

The word couple is used in standard French as a masculine noun (a couple, married or unmarried), but in Quebec it is also used as a feminine noun in phrases like une couple de semaines (a couple of weeks).  This is often thought to be an anglicism, but is in fact a preservation of an archaic French usage.

It is quite common in Quebec French to describe something positive using litotes, such as pas laid (not ugly) for beautiful or pas pire (not worst) for good when standard French would suggest using the positive equivalent instead. However, Metropolitan French has its own commonly used litotes: pas bête or pas con (smart); pas mal (fine); pas dégueu(lasse) (tasty); and pas top, pas super or pas génial (bad).

Prepositions 
The preposition à is often used in possessive contexts, whereas standard French uses de; le char à Pierre ("Pierre's car") instead of la voiture de Pierre. This is also found in the informal French of France, such as Hier j'ai vu la copine à Bruno ("Yesterday I saw Bruno's girlfriend").

In a number of cases, Quebec speakers prefer to use the preposition à instead of using a non-prepositional phrase with ce ("this"); for example à matin or à soir instead of ce matin and ce soir ("this morning" and "this evening"). Note also à cette heure, pronounced and sometimes spelt asteure or astheure (literally "at this time") for maintenant ("now") and désormais ("henceforth"), which is also found in Queneau.  These usages of à are considered colloquial.

Nautical terms
A number of terms that in other French-speaking regions are exclusively nautical are used in wider contexts in Quebec. This is often attributed to the original arrival of French immigrants by ship, and to the dominance of the Saint Lawrence River as the principal means of transport among the major settlements of the region in the past centuries. An example is the word débarquer, which in Quebec means to get off any conveyance (a car, a train); in France, this word means only to disembark from a ship or aircraft (descendre from other vehicles), plus some colloquial uses. Another example would be vadrouille for mop (in French it would mean wandering or a mop made of ropes and used on a ship, the regular house mop would be called serpillère).

Political terms
Since Canada uses the Westminster system, unlike republican France, many political terms devised in English have had to be imported or new terms created.  This is not always easy, and can lead to awkward constructions, the most famous example being Dominion, for which there is no French translation.  As well in Canadian English the first minister of the federation is called the Prime Minister and the first minister of a province is called a Premier.
However French makes no distinction and both are called Premier ministre in all cases. For example, "Premier ministre du Canada", "Premier ministre du Québec / de l'Alberta", etc.

Quebec specialties
There are also words for Quebec specialties that do not exist in Europe, for example poutine, CEGEP, tuque (a Canadianism in both official languages), and dépanneur (a corner store/small grocery; dépanneur in France is a mechanic who comes in to repair a car or a household appliance, which is called a dépanneuse in Quebec).

Blueberries, abundant in the Saguenay-Lac-Saint-Jean, are called bleuets; in France, they are lumped together with myrtilles (bilberries) and bleuet means cornflower. (Bleuet is also slang for someone from Saguenay-Lac-Saint-Jean.)  Although very similar, these are not the same plants (i.e. myrtilles are Vaccinium myrtillus and bleuets are Vaccinium angustifolium or corymbosum).

Informality
French speakers of Quebec use the informal second-person pronoun tu more often and in more contexts than speakers in France do. In certain contexts it may be perfectly appropriate to address a stranger or even the customer of a store using tu, whereas the latter would be considered impolite in France.  The split often runs across generations in Quebec:  Persons between 40 and 60 years of age often feel that sales persons, or service personnel giving them a tu instead of a vous are uncouth or uncultivated.  Persons 60 years of age and older will sometimes feel insulted if a stranger uses the tu to them.  Government employees (such as policemen or bureaucrats with some contact with the public) as well as employees of large stores or large chains in Quebec are usually instructed to use vous with everybody, unless some kind of camaraderie is in play or they know the person well. Sometimes the split is also across social or educational lines.  For instance, young academics are usually hesitant in using tu with slightly older colleagues who have just a few more years of seniority.

A similar distinction in English, where, since the second person singular "thou" went out of use 200 years ago, might be whether to address or respond to someone on a "first-name basis". For example, one might say to a man that one has just met, "Thank you, Mr. Gibson" — equivalent to using vous. If Mr Gibson wants to maintain formality, that is, similar to using vous, he might say, "You're welcome", and if he wants to be more relaxed and familiar, he would add, "Please call me Jim". This gives Anglophones an inkling of the use of tu in Canadian French.

Metropolitan French public speakers such as politicians occasionally come across as stuffy or snobbish to certain Quebec Francophones. There is also a certain impression among the Quebec population (men especially) that Metropolitan French is quite effeminate - though this is not often directly discussed. This may explain why even better educated Québécois rarely try to emulate the Metropolitan French accent, though many probably could do so with relative ease. This is also true for people from southern France. Visitors from southern France who move temporarily to Paris and pick up the local Parisian accent may be derided by their friends who have remained in the south. This is all similar to the perception North American English-speakers may have of British English as "uppity" or "fancy".

Idioms
There is a huge variety of idioms in Quebec that do not exist in France, such as fait que ("so"); en masse ("a lot"); s'en venir (for arriver and venir ici); ben là! or voyons donc! ("oh, come on!"), de même (for comme ça).

Entire reference books have been written about idioms specific to Quebec. A handful of examples among many hundreds:
 J'ai mon voyage = J'en ai marre / Pas possible! = I'm fed up / Unbelievable!
 C'est de valeur = C'est dommage = What a pity
 Habillé comme la chienne à Jacques = Dressed up like a dog's dinner
 C’est malade/fou raide = That's sick/crazy/rad
 Se faire avoir = to get fooled
 Mais que = lorsque, quand que = When... (the subjunctive must follow this form)
 Tirer le diable par la queue = Avoir les difficultés avec l’argent = I'm in a tight spot financially
 Se faire passer un sapin = To be lied to
 Avoir une face à claque = a bad person
 Avoir les yeux dans la graisse de bines = to be in love or to be tired (glassy-eyed)
 Avoir l’estomac dans les talons = to be extremely hungry
 Être né pour un petit pain = One who doesn't have many opportunities. Usually used in the negative form.
 Il fait frette = It is cold
 Chanter la pomme = to flirt
 Se pogner le cul = to sit and do nothing all day
 Je m'en sacre = I do not give a damn

Dialogue in sitcoms on Quebec television often uses such idioms extensively, which can make certain dialogues rather incomprehensible to French speakers of Europe. Most speakers will use various contractions, omitting certain articles or even changing the pronunciation of certain words, which can be daunting for inexperienced speakers.

Slang terms
As with any two regional variants, there is an abundance of slang terms found in Quebec that are not found in France. Quebec French profanity uses references to Catholic liturgical equipment, rather than the references to prostitution that are more common in France.

The expression "you're welcome" is bienvenue or ça me fait plaisir in Quebec, though de rien or pas de quoi is also used in Quebec. Note that the expression bonne journée (as opposed to bonjour) is also often used for "goodbye" in Quebec (similar to "Good Day"), which it is not in France (where it is more common to say au revoir or bye).

Some slang terms unique to Quebec:

Words from aboriginal languages

Use of anglicisms

Loanwords from English, as well as calques or loans of syntactic structures, are known as anglicisms (French: anglicismes).

Colloquial and slang registers

The use of anglicisms in colloquial and Quebec French slang is commonplace, but varies from a place to another, depending on the English presence in the area. These words cannot be used in official documents or in academic writing, etc. Some examples of long-standing anglicisms include:

{| class="wikitable"
|-
! Anglicism
! Meaning
! English word (cognate)
|-
| anyway
| Anyway
|
|-
| all-dressed
| With all the toppings [pizza, etc.]
|
|-
| bécosse
| Outhouse, washroom
| backhouse
|-
| bines
| Pork and beans
| beans
|-
| blood
| (adj.) nice, generous [of a person]
|
|-
| chum
| Male friend; boyfriend [chum de fille = female friend, blonde=girlfriend]
| chum
|-
| checker
| To check
| check
|-
| chiffe/chiffre
| A shift [work period at factory, etc.]
| shift
|-
| cruiser
| Make a pass at
| cruise
|-
| cute
| Cute (good-looking)
|
|-
| domper
| To dump (a boyfriend or girlfriend)
| dump
|-
| faker
| To simulate, pretend (e.g., orgasm)
| fake
|-
| fan
| A fan (of a band, a sports team), a ceiling fan
|
|-
| filer
| To feel [guilty, etc.]; when unmodified, to feel good; negated, to feel bad (j'file pas astheure)
| feel
|-
| flusher
| To flush (toilet); get rid of; dump [boyfriend/girlfriend]
| flush
|-
| flyé
| Extravagant, far out, over the top
| fly
|-
| frencher
| To French kiss
| French
|-
| full
| Very much (je l'aime full), full (Le réservoir est full)
|
|-
| game
| Game, sports match or, used as an adjective, meaning having the courage to do something; Je suis game.
|
|-
| good
| Good! [expressing approval; not as an adjective]
|
|-
| hot
| Hot (excellent, attractive)
|
|-
| hot-chicken
| Hot Chicken sandwich
| hot chicken
|-
| lousse
| Loose, untied, released
| loose
|-
| moppe
| Mop
| mop
|-
| pantré
| The pantry or food cupboard; mets-ça s'a pantré
| pantry
|-
| pâte à dents
| Toothpaste
| calque of "toothpaste"
|-
| peanut
| Peanut or something of little value (Travailler pour des peanuts.) While the spelling ‘’pinotte’’ is valid, it is seldomly used, especially in formal contexts. The alternate spelling ‘’peanut’’ is more widespread throughout Quebec including cities like Victoriaville.
|
|-
| pitcher
| to throw, to pitch
| to pitch
|-
| poignee le ditch
| to fall in the ditch with your car
| 
|-
| party
| Party, social gathering
|
|-
| scramme
| Scram! Get lost!
|
|-
| scrapper
| Scrap, ruin, break, destroy, nullify
| scrap
|-
| slacker
| to slacken, loosen; slack off, take it easy; fire [employee]
| slack
|-
| smatte
| Smart; wise-guy (either good or bad, as in "smart ass"); likeable [person]; cool;
| smart
|-
| smoke meat
| Montreal smoked meat (similar to pastrami)
| smoked meat
|-
| swomp
| Swamp, bog
| swamp
|-
| toast
| Can be used as the verb for toasting (Toast mes tranches de pain or Tu as bien trop fait toasté mon pain). Québécois can also use the word toaster' instead of grille-pain for the appliance.
| toast
|-
| tof| Difficult, rough
| tough
|-
| toffer| Withstand, endure
| tough it out
|-
| toune| Song
| tune
|-
| whatever| (Indicating dismissal)
| whatever
|}

It is also very commonplace for an English word to be used as a nonce word, for example when the speaker temporarily cannot remember the French word. This is particularly common with technical words; indeed, years ago before technical documentation began to be printed in French in Quebec, an English word might be the most common way for a French-speaking mechanic or other technical worker to refer to the mechanisms he or she had to deal with.

It is often difficult or impossible to distinguish between such a nonce anglicism and an English word quoted as such for effect.

There are some anglicisms that have no obvious connection to any currently existing modern Canadian English idiom. For example, être sur le party ("to be on the 'party'", to be partying or to be in the mood for a party).

Standard register
A number of Quebecisms used in the standard register are also derived from English forms, especially as calques, such as prendre une marche (from "take a walk," in France, se promener, also used in Quebec) and banc de neige (from English "snowbank;" in France, congère, a form unknown in Quebec.) However, in standard and formal registers, there is a much stronger tendency to avoid English borrowings in Quebec than in France.

As a result, especially with regard to in modern items, Quebec French often contains forms designed to be more "French" than an English borrowing that may be used anyway in European French, like fin de semaine which is week-end in France, or courriel (from courrier électronique) for France's mail or mel.

Some are calques into French of English phrases that Continental French borrowed directly, such as un chien chaud for European French hot dog. In Quebec, the spelling gai to mean homosexual is standard. Note that in France, gai has kept the original meaning of "happy", "cheerful" while gay is used to mean "homosexual" but specifically in reference to mass gay-American subculture and by those usually over 35 who identify as gay. Gay men in France 35 and under usually label themselves as homo, not gay.

Although many (not all) of these forms were promulgated by the Office québécois de la langue française (OQLF) of Quebec, they have been accepted into everyday use. Indeed, the French government has since adopted the word courriel (in 2003). The term has been gaining acceptance as it is now used in respected newspapers such as Libération.

Jargons and slangs
Several social groups, tied together by either a profession or an interest, use a part or all of the corresponding English jargon or slang in their domains, instead of that used in other French-speaking countries. English terms are, for example, very widely used in typically male jobs like engineering (notably mechanical engineering), carpentry, and computer programming. This situation was caused historically by a lack of properly translated technical manuals and documentation.

Recent translation efforts in targeted domains such as the automotive industry and environmental engineering are yielding some results encouraging to Francophiles. The most English-ridden Quebec slang without question is used among members of the gamer community, who are also for the most part Millennials and frequent computer users. In these circles, computer gaming slang is used as well as an enormous number of normal terms commonly found in computer applications and games (save, map, level, etc.).

Perception

The perceived overuse of anglicisms in the colloquial register is one cause of the stigmatization of Quebec French. Both the Québécois and the European French accuse each other (and themselves) of using too many anglicisms. A running joke of the difference between European French and Quebec French is that in Europe, on se gare dans un parking (one parks in a carpark) and in Quebec, on se parque dans un stationnement (one parks in a parking lot).

Quebec and France tend to have entirely different anglicisms because in Quebec they are the gradual result of two and a half centuries of living with English speaking neighbors, whereas in Europe anglicisms are much more recent and the result of the increasing international dominance of American English.

Other differences
Like most global languages there are regional differences. Even within Quebec there are regional uses of words or expression. Here are some other differences between standard Quebec French and European French:

Many, but not all, of the European equivalents for the words listed above are also used or at least understood in Quebec.

See also

Official Quebec dictionary (Grand dictionnaire terminologique multilingue by the Office québécois de la langue française)
Quebec French profanity

References

 Further reading 
 Meney, Lionel, Dictionnaire québécois-français : pour mieux se comprendre entre francophones'', Guérin éditeur, Montréal, 1999.

Lexicon